McGehee is a surname of Scottish origin. Notable people with the surname include:

Casey McGehee (born 1982), American baseball player
Edward McGehee (1786–1880), American plantation owner
Eugene McGehee (1929–2014), American politician
Harvey McGehee (1887–1965), American judge and politician
Ned McGehee (1907–1989), American college sports coach
Richard McGehee (born 1943), American mathematician
Robby McGehee (born 1973), American Indy driver
Scott McGehee (born 1962), American film director and screenwriter
Tom McGehee (1924–2002), American businessperson and philanthropist